Prof. Aly Saad  ( born 25 April 1954), is a professor of cardiology at Zagazig University and a Member of higher committee of promotion of professors and Assistant professors of cardiovascular diseases and Critical care Subspecialty in Egypt ( Supreme council of Egyptian universities).

Background 
Before his graduation during undergraduate study he established Zagazig Student Scientific Society, and with group of active medical students founded the Egyptian Associations of Medical Scientific Societies and was the first elected president of this association. The association has wide and invaluable scientific and social activities nationally and internationally, including an annual exchange program for medical students all over the world, organizing and supervising many local and international conferences, Continuing medical education programs, editing many medical and scientific magazines, wide range of medical, scientific and environmental activities.

During this period he prepared and broadcast a public scientific program – Science in your hands – on Abu Dhabi radio for over 2 years. Immediately postgraduate he with others founded the Society of Young Doctors. After his residency in cardiovascular disease he became an assistant lecturer in cardiovascular diseases and during this period he was a director of catheterization unit.

Then through a long scientific and academic life he became a professor of cardiovascular disease in Zagazig University. He also supervised a long list of leading master and doctorate thesis and published many scientific papers in a wide variety of Cardiovascular subspecialties. He is a founding member of the Working Group of Drug Therapy ( Egyptian Society of Cardiology), and the Egyptian Society of Atherosclerosis that organized a considerable number of national and international conferences, and through them and in others he gave many scientific talks.

Recognition 
 Being a Fellow of the European Society of Cardiology in 2000 he has received many acknowledgements in (2000, 2008, 2013)
                                     Acknowledged as an outstanding reviewer by Elsevier Publisher (2014, 2015)
                                     Best investigator in EuroHeart Survey program of European Society of Cardiology.
                                     Acknowledged from Zagazig Faculty of medicine and many Other Arabic, Egyptian and international bodies.
                                     Selected as one of the most eminent cardiologists in the Arabic world by cardiology department, Zagazig University, supreme council of Egyptian universities upon the request of Arab League.
                                     Selected as one of international expert in preventive Cardiology and member of panel for reviewing guidelines and Putting recommendations in this fields by 9 European societies helping in health plans in European union.

Memberships 
 Member of editorial board of The Egyptian Heart Journal (the official journal of the Egyptian Society of Cardiology, a member of The European Society of Cardiology ).
 Selected as a member in the European Endothelium Committee (Mediterranean Project).
 Member of organizing committee, speaker and chairman of the 4th World Congress of Echo-cardiography and Vascular Ultrasound organized by the International Society of Cardiovascular Ultrasound (ISCU) (Cairo, 19–21 January 2000)
 Member of the organizing committee, speaker and / or chairman of the annual scientific joint conference of department of cardiology (Zagazig University) and the Egyptian society of cardiology from 1993–2014.
 Member of the panellists of the joint meeting of the Egyptian Society of Cardiology and Texas Heart Institute (Cairo, 1 March 1995)
 Member of scientific board and chairman in the 6th annual congress of the Egyptian working group of International cardiology
 Member of the organizing committee of the annual congress of the Mediterranean Association of Cardiology and Cardiac Surgery (MACCS) in Egypt Sharm El-sheikh ( 7–10 November 2001).
 Member of Executive board of the scientific council of Zagazig faculty of medicine.
                                                  He is a voting (and honourable EB) member of working group of Hypertension and Heart (European Society of Cardiology ), European Association of heart failure, European Association of PCI, European Association of prevention and rehabilitation.

International World Wide Research Programs 
 Euro Heart Survey ( EHS) –European Society of Cardiology (ESC)
 EURO HEART SURVEY (EHS) Acute Coronary Syndrome (ACS) snapshot, ESC (2010).
 Euro Hear Survey (EHS) on Percutaneous Coronary Intervention (PCI) Registry (2008–2010)
 Euro Hear Survey (EHS) on Acute Coronary Syndrome III (ACS III) registry, ESC (2008).
 ACS study, ESC (2006).
 Euro Hear Survey (EHS) on Heart Failure II (EHFII) Registry.
 PCI study (2005–2006).
 Euro Hear Survey (EHS) on Atrial Fibrillation (AF) Registry (2004) (from which HAS bleed and CHAD2score Score have been established)
 Ischaemic Heart Diseases and Dibetes study (2003)
 Euro Heart Survey on Coronary Revascularization (REVASC) registry study (2002)
 EurObservational Research Program (EORP)
 EurObservational Research Program (EORP) on Pregnancy and Cardiac Disease (ROPAC) registry
 PeriPartum Cardiomyopathy (PPCM) registry
 Cardiomyopathy Long Term registry
 Others
 GAPS-HF Study World Heart Failure Society.
 Expert opinion for EAPCI pre and post results for DAPT,ITALIC, ESAR-SAFE and MATRIX studies.

Some of the publications and researches 
 Acute Coronary Syndrome (ACS) snapshot Registry

 Euro Heart Survey on Coronary Revascularization (REVASC) Registry

 Euro Hear Survey (EHS) on Diabetes and Heart Registry

 23- Abnormal glucose regulation in patients with coronary artery disease across Europe M Bartnik, L Rydén, R Ferrari, K Malmberg, K Pyorala, ML Simoons, E Standl, J Soler-Soler, J Ohrvik.. Aly Saad...." Diabetologia 47, A61-A61.2004 (23)
 Euro Hear Survey (EHS) on Heart Failure II (EHFII) Registry
 
 Contemporary management of octogenarians hospitalized for heart failure in Europe: Euro Heart Failure Survey II Michel Komajda, Olivier Hanon, Matthias Hochadel, Jose Luis Lopez-Sendon, Ferenc Follath, Piotr Ponikowski, Veli-Pekka Harjola, Helmut Drexler, Kenneth Dickstein, Luigi Tavazzi, Markku Nieminen,.... Aly Saad..... European heart journal, 2009
 Gender related differences in patients presenting with acute heart failure. Results from EuroHeart Failure Survey II Markku S Nieminen, Veli‐Pekka Harjola, Matthias Hochadel, Helmut Drexler, Michel Komajda, Dirk Brutsaert, Kenneth Dickstein, Piotr Ponikowski, Luigi Tavazzi, Ferenc Follath, Jose Luis Lopez‐Sendon...Aly Saad..... European journal of heart failure, 2008

 Euro Hear Survey (EHS) on Acute Coronary Syndrome III (ACS III) Registry

 Value of Killip classification first described in 1967 for risk stratification of STEMI and NSTE-ACS in the new millennium: Lessons from the Euro Heart Survey ACS Registry AK Gitt, U Zeymer, M Hochadel, M Gierlotka, H Bueno, R Zahn, W Wojakowski, F Schiele, M Tendera, JP Bassand...Aly Saad.. .......... EUROPEAN HEART JOURNAL, 2010
 Reperfusion strategy in Europe: temporal trends in performance measures for reperfusion therapy in ST-elevation myocardial infarction François Schiele, Matthias Hochadel, Marco Tubaro, Nicolas Meneveau, Wojtek Wojakowski, Marek Gierlotka, Lech Polonski, Jean-Pierre Bassand, Keith AA Fox, Anselm K Gitt....Aly Saad... ..... EUROPEAN HEART JOURNAL, 2010
 MAJOR BLEEDING COMPLICATIONS IN PATIENTS WITH STEMI ACCOUNT FOR A DOUBLING IN HOSPITAL MORTALITY IN CLINICAL PRACTICE: LESSONS FROM THE EURO HEART SURVEY ACS REGISTRY.Anselm K. Gitt; Frank Towae; Ralf Zahn; Huo Katus; Marek Gierlotka; Wojtek Wojakowski; Michal Tendera; Francois Schiele; Jean-Pierre Bassand.....Aly Saad.......... EUROPEAN HEART JOURNAL, 2009
 Euro Hear Survey (EHS) on Atrial Fibrillation (AF) Registry

 Clinical correlates of immediate success and outcome at 1-year follow-up of real-world cardioversion of atrial fibrillation: the Euro Heart Survey Ron Pisters, Robby Nieuwlaat, Martin H Prins, Jean-Yves Le Heuzey, Aldo P Maggioni, A John Camm, Harry JGM Crijns, Aly Saad...Europace, 2012
 A novel user-friendly score (HAS-BLED) to assess 1-year risk of major bleeding in patients with atrial fibrillation: the Euro Heart Survey Ron Pisters, Deirdre A Lane, Robby Nieuwlaat, Cees B de Vos, Harry JGM Crijns, Gregory YH Lip......., Aly Saad.... Chest,2010
 Progression from paroxysmal to persistent atrial fibrillation: clinical correlates and prognosis Cees B de Vos, Ron Pisters, Robby Nieuwlaat, Martin H Prins, Robert G Tieleman, Robert-Jan S Coelen, Antonius C van den Heijkant, Maurits A Allessie, Harry JGM Crijns........Aly Saad....Journal of the American College of Cardiology, 2010
 Refining clinical risk stratification for predicting stroke and thromboembolism in atrial fibrillation using a novel risk factor-based approach: the euro heart survey on atrial fibrillation Gregory YH Lip, Robby Nieuwlaat, Ron Pisters, Deirdre A Lane, Harry JGM Crijns........Aly Saad....Chest, 2010
 Atrial fibrillation and heart failure in cardiology practice: reciprocal impact and combined management from the perspective of atrial fibrillation: results of the Euro Heart Survey on atrial fibrillation Robby Nieuwlaat, Luc W Eurlings, John G Cleland, Stuart M Cobbe, Panos E Vardas, Alessandro Capucci, José L López-Sendòn, Joan G Meeder, Yigal M Pinto, Harry HJGM Crijns........Aly Saad.... Journal of the American College of Cardiology,2009
 Euro Hear Survey (EHS) on Percutaneous Coronary Intervention (PCI) Registry

 Fate of Patients With Coronary Perforation Complicating Percutaneous Coronary Intervention (from the Euro Heart Survey Percutaneous Coronary Intervention Registry).Bauer T, Boeder N, Nef HM, Möllmann H, Hochadel M, Marco J, Weidinger F, Zeymer U, Get AK, Hamm CW....Aly Saad...Am J Cardiol. 2015 Nov 1;116(9):1363-7

 Fate of patients with coronary perforation complicating PCI: insights from the Euro Heart Survey PCI registry T Bauer, H Nef, M Hochadel, H Moellmann, F Weidinger, J Marco, A Gitt, U Zeymer, C Hamm...Aly Saad.... EUROPEAN HEART JOURNAL, 2014
 Use and outcome of thrombectomy in patients with primary PCI for acute ST elevation myocardial infarction: results from the Euro Heart Survey PCI registry T Bauer, K Weipert, M Hochadel, H Nef, H Moellmann, J Marco, F Weidinger, A Gitt, U Zeymer, C Hamm....Aly Saad... EUROPEAN HEART JOURNAL, 2014
 Achievement of TIMI-3- Flow Results in Significant Decrease in Hospital Mortality of Primary PCI for STEMI and PCI for NSTE-ACS – Findings of the Euro Heart Survey PCI- Registry

 Prima- vista multi-vessel percutaneous coronary intervention in haemodynamically stable patients with acute coronary syndromes: Analysis of over 4.400 patients in the EHS-PCI registry Timm Bauer, Uwe Zeymer, Matthias Hochadel, Helge Möllmann, Franz Weidinger, Ralf Zahn, Holger M Nef, Christian W Hamm, Jean Marco, Anselm K Gitt, Aly Saad...International Journal of Cardiology, 2013

 Clinical and angiographic comparison between circumflex artery-related ST elevation and non ST elevation myocardial infarctions: results from the Euro Heart Survey PCI registry T Bauer, A Gitt, M Hochadel, H Moellmann, H Nef, F Weidinger, J Marco, R Zahn, C Hamm, U Zeymer, Aly Saad. EUROPEAN HEART JOURNAL 33, 461–462 2012

 The high event rate in patients with diabetes mellitus treated with PCI for acute coronary syndromes is observed in the subgroup of patients with impaired renal function. Results of the Euro Heart Survey U Zeymer, T Bauer, M Hochadel, F Weidinger, R Zahn, AK Gitt,... Aly Saad... EUROPEAN HEART JOURNAL, 2011
 Use and outcomes of multi-vessel percutaneous coronary intervention in haemodynamically stable patients with acute coronary syndrome: results of the EHS-PCI registry T Bauer, U Zeymer, M Hochadel, H Moellmann, F Weidinger, R Zahn, HM Nef, C Hamm, J Marco, AK Gitt, Aly Saad.. EUROPEAN HEART JOURNAL 32, 1042–1042. 2011

 EuroHeart score for the evaluation of in-hospital mortality in patients undergoing percutaneous coronary intervention Maarten de Mulder, Anselm Gitt, Ron van Domburg, Matthias Hochadel, Ricardo Seabra-Gomes, Patrick W Serruys, Sigmund Silber, Franz Weidinger, William Wijns, Uwe Zeymer, Christian Hamm, Eric Boersma, Aly Saad.... European heart journal 32 (11), 1398–1408.2011
 CURRENT PRACTICE OF PCI FOR ACS AND STABLE ANGINA IN EUROPE 2005–2008: LESSONS FROM THE EURO HEART SURVEY PCI REGISTRY Anselm K Gitt, Matthias Hochadel, Uwe Zeymer, Ralf Zahn, Franz Weidinger, Timm Bauer, Christian Hamm, Aly Saad. Journal of the American College of Cardiology,2011
 Lower Rate of Major Bleeding Complications With Radial Arterial Access for Elective PCI in Clinical Practice in Europe: Results of the Euro Heart Survey PCI-Registry Anselm K Gitt, Timm Bauer, Uwe Zeymer, Matthias Hochadel, Ralf Zahn, Christian Hamm, Aly Saad ... Circulation 122 (21 Supplement), A20964.2010

 IMPACT OF RENAL FAILURE ON MORTALITY, STROKE AND BLEEDING COMPLICATIONS IN THE SETTING OF PCI FOR ACS OR STABLE ANGINA IN EUROPE: LESSONS FROM THE EURO HEART SURVEY PCI REGISTRY Anselm K Gitt, Timm Bauer, Uwe Zeymer, Ralf Zahn, Franz Weidinger, Matthias Hochadel, Christian Hamm, ...Aly Saad... Journal of the American College of Cardiology, 2010
 Incidence and clinical impact of stroke complicating percutaneous coronary intervention results of the euro heart survey percutaneous coronary interventions registry Nicolas Werner, Timm Bauer, Matthias Hochadel, Ralf Zahn, Franz Weidinger, Jean Marco, Christian Hamm, Anselm K Gitt, Uwe Zeymer,.. Aly Saad .. Circulation: Cardiovascular Interventions, 2013
 EurObservational Research Program (EORP) on Pregnancy and Cardiac Disease (ROPAC) Registry

References

External links 
 
 

1954 births
Living people
Academic staff of Zagazig University
Egyptian cardiologists